General elections were held in Zambia on 27 October 1983. At the time, the country was a one-party state, with the United National Independence Party (UNIP) as the only legally permitted party. Its leader, Kenneth Kaunda was automatically re-elected for a fifth term as President, and was confirmed in office with over 95% of the vote. UNIP also won all 125 seats in the National Assembly. Voter turnout was around 63% in the parliamentary election, but 65.5% in the presidential election.

Campaign
Prior to the elections, primary elections were held to elect candidates for the 125 constituencies. Only UNIP members could vote in the primaries, and the top three candidates would be able to stand for the National Assembly election. In total, 812 people stood for election to the National Assembly, with 46 rejected by the UNIP central committee.

Results

President
Kaunda was the sole candidate for president, and voters voted yes or no to his candidacy. Some sources reported the results to be 93% for and 7% against.

National Assembly

See also
List of members of the National Assembly of Zambia (1983–88)

References

Zambia
General
Elections in Zambia
One-party elections
Presidential elections in Zambia
Election and referendum articles with incomplete results